Phaulernis fulviguttella, the yellow-spotted lance-wing, is a moth of the  family Epermeniidae found in the Palearctic including Europe.

Description
The wingspan is 10–11 mm. The forewings are dark fuscous ; a spot on dorsum towards tornus, and another in disc posteriorly pale ochreous-yellow. The hindwings are dark fuscous. The larva is whitish ; head brownish.

There is one generation per year with adults on wing from July to August.

The larvae feed on the seeds of Peucedanum, Angelica, Heracleum and Pimpinella species, as well as Scots lovage (Ligusticum scoticum). The larvae are white with grey spots and a dark head, living within spun seeds and can be found from September to October. The species overwinters in the pupal stage within a flimsy cocoon on the ground.

Distribution
It is found in most of Europe, the Caucasus, the Russian Far East and Japan.

Taxonomy
Phaulernis fulviguttella was the scientific name used by Philipp Christoph Zeller when he described a specimen found in Bohmen, Mecklenburg, Germany in 1839. Zeller originally placed Phaulernis fulviguttella in the genus Oecophora as did Stainton in 1849 and Frey in 1867, when they also described the moth, not knowing about Zeller's earlier description.

References

Epermeniidae
Moths described in 1839
Moths of Europe
Moths of Japan
Moths of Asia
Taxa named by Philipp Christoph Zeller